The Stephen Roth Institute for the Study of Contemporary Antisemitism and Racism is a research institute at Tel Aviv University in Israel.

It is a resource for information, provides a forum for academic discussion, and fosters research on issues concerning antisemitic and racist theories and manifestations. The institute's principal focus is the social and political exploitation of these phenomena in the period since the end of World War II, and the influence of their historical background.

Details
The institute was founded as the Project for the Study of Anti-Semitism in the fall of 1991, and was headed by Prof. Dina Porat of Tel Aviv University until 2010. Since then, Dr. Scott Ury of Tel Aviv University's Department of Jewish History has been Director of the Roth Institute. The institute is situated within Tel Aviv University's Faculty of the Humanities and is associated with the Wiener Library for the Study of the Nazi Era and the Holocaust in Tel Aviv, home of one of the world's richest collections of documents related to fascist regimes and movements, and antisemitism. The Institute welcomes visitors and fosters cooperation with universities and research institutes outside Israel.

References

External links
 Homepage
 "Roth Institute Newsletter 2018,"
 "Roth Institute Newsletter 2017,"
 "Roth Institute Newsletter 2016,"
 "Fear of Neighbours: Graduate Student Workshop with Jan T. Gross," Tel Aviv University, April, 2012. 
 "The Education of Barack Obama," Lecture at Tel Aviv University, Prof. Thomas Sugrue, The University of Pennsylvania, May, 2013.
 "Lucy S. Dawidowicz: An American in Vilna," Naomi Prawer Kadar Annual Lecture, Prof. Nancy Sinkoff, Rutgers University, June, 2013.
 "Jews and Race: An Interdisciplinary Symposium on Genetics, History and Culture," Tel Aviv University, January, 2014.
 "International Law, Antisemitism and Jewish Lawyering at the United Nations," Seminar at TAU's Law School, Prof. James Loeffler, The University of Virginia, March, 2014.
 "The Holocaust as Genocide: Integrated History and Scholarly Integrity," Lecture at TAU, Prof. Omer Bartov, Brown University, May, 2014.
 "Conversion: Between Antisemitism and Philo-Semitism," Workshop with Prof. David Nirenberg, The University of Chicago, Nov., 2014.
 "Holocaust and Genocide Studies in the Academic World," Lecture at TAU, Prof. Deborah Dwork, Clark University, Dec., 2014.
Jewish Rights, Minority Rights, Human Rights," Video of International Conference at TAU, March, 2015.
"The Assassination of Symon Petliura and the Trial of Sholom Schwartzbard, 1926-1927,"Lecture at TAU, Prof. David Engel, NYU, Dec. 2015.
"Images of Jews in the Early Age of Print," Lecture at Roth Institute, TAU, Prof. Elisheva Carlebach, Columbia University, Jan., 2016.
"Theodor Herzl: Between Antisemitism, Race and Empire," Lecture at TAU, Prof. Derek Penslar, Oxford and Toronto, March, 2016. "Podcast".
"Philosemitism and Antisemitism in Biblical Criticism," Lecture at TAU, Prof. Hindy Najman, University of Oxford, November, 2017. "Podcast".
"A Misplaced Massacre: Struggling Over the Memory of Sand Creek," Lecture at TAU, Prof. Ari Kelman, University of California-Davis, March, 2018. The lecture is part of "Race & Racism in America," series.

Centers for the study of antisemitism
Religion and politics
History of antisemitism
Research institutes in Israel
Social science institutes
Tel Aviv University
Israel based opposition to antisemitism